The Red Needle (French: L'aiguille rouge, German: Verträumte Tage) is a 1951 French-West German drama film directed by Emil-Edwin Reinert and starring Michel Auclair, Michèle Philippe and Jean Marchat. It was shot at the Joinville Studios in Paris and the Bavaria Studios in Munich. The film's sets were designed by the art director Georges Wakhévitch. The film was partly shot on location in Mittenwald and the Bavarian Alps. It was based on a story by Vicki Baum. A separate German version Dreaming Days was made with a different cast.

Cast
 Michel Auclair as Florian Faber  
 Michèle Philippe as Maya Berger 
 Jean Marchat as Berger  
 Margo Lion as Fanny  
 René Génin as Henri  
 Colette Jacommet as Maya, enfant  
 Claude Maritz as Hans, le guide

References

Bibliography 
 Krautz, Alfred. International directory of cinematographers set- and costume designers in film. Saur, 1983.

External links 
 

1951 films
French drama films
German drama films
1951 drama films
1950s French-language films
Films directed by Emil-Edwin Reinert
Films shot in Bavaria
Films based on short fiction
Films set in the Alps
French multilingual films
1950s multilingual films
French black-and-white films
German black-and-white films
1950s French films
1950s German films
Films shot at Joinville Studios
Films shot at Bavaria Studios
French-language German films